Joshua Fisher (born 25 October 1989) is a singer-songwriter from Lewisham in South London, currently living in Norwich, England.

His debut EP, "Atlas" was scheduled to be released on 25 October 2010 by independent London based label Polymorph Records.  "Atlas" features four songs, which have been co-produced by Roger Pusey – former producer of The Smiths albums Hatful of Hollow and Louder Than Bombs.

Fisher cites Nick Drake, Bright Eyes and The Waterboys among his influences.

References

External links 
 Joshua Fisher's Website
 Polymorph Records
 Joshua Fisher's BBC Music page

1989 births
Living people
English male singer-songwriters
Musicians from London
People from Lewisham
Musicians from Kent
Musicians from Norwich
21st-century English singers
21st-century British male singers